Saathi is a 1968 Indian Hindi-language romance film written and directed by C. V. Sridhar. The film stars Rajendra Kumar and Vyjayanthimala, with Simi Garewal, Pahari Sanyal, David Abraham Cheulkar, Veena and Ram Mohan as the ensemble cast while prominent actors such as Shashi Kapoor, Nanda, Sanjeev Kumar, Shabnam, D.K. Sapru and Pratima Devi made guest appearances. The film was produced by S. Krishnamurthy and T. Govindarajan of Venus Pictures. The film's score was composed by Naushad with lyrics provided by Majrooh Sultanpuri. It was edited by N. M. Shankar and filmed by Marcus Bartley.

Saathi is a triangular love story among Ravi, Shanti and Rajni. The film was a remake of the 1961 Tamil film Palum Pazhamum, which was directed by A. Bhimsingh.

Plot 
Dr. Ravi returns from abroad and takes up a position as chief surgeon in a hospital. He meets with Nurse Shanti, who lives an impoverished lifestyle with her ailing mother, on whom he decides to perform surgery, but she passes away. A guilt-ridden Ravi marries Shanti much to the chagrin of his mentor, Kaka, who had hoped that he would marry his daughter, Rajni.

The couple travel to Kashmir for their honeymoon, and settle down to a harmonious relationship. Hoping to travel more, their plans are interrupted by the hospital's head doctor, who wants Ravi to focus on cancer research. The couple drop their travel plans and immerse themselves in research so much so that Shanti becomes ill, and not wanting to become a burden, leaves. A frantic Ravi searches high and low in vain, and is subsequently devastated to learn that she has perished in a train accident. Kaka then becomes very ill and Kaki tells Ravi that the cause of his illness is Rajni's insistence that she not marry anyone except Ravi. As a result, Ravi marries her but is unable to get Shanti out of his mind. An embittered Rajni feels neglected and decides to confront him, resulting in his losing his vision, perhaps never to see again, and unable to do any further cancer research.

Cast 
 Rajendra Kumar as Ravi
 Vyjayanthimala as Shanti / Sharda
 Simi Garewal as Rajni
 Pahari Sanyal as Rajni's Father
 David Abraham Cheulkar as Head Doctor
 Veena as Rajni's Mother
 Ram Mohan as Ravi's Colleague

Guest appearances include:

 Shashi Kapoor as actor during the filming of Raja Saab
 Nanda as actor during the filming of Raja Saab
 Sanjeev Kumar as Ashok
 Shabnam
 D.K. Sapru as Mr. Philips
 Radhakrishan as Sadhuram
 Pratima Devi as Shanti's Mother

Soundtrack 
When Sridhar approached Naushad for composing, he listened to the songs of the original film which was composed by Viswanathan–Ramamoorthy in Tamil. After listening to the songs, Naushad wrote a letter to M. S. Viswanathan saying that he cannot replace the wonderful music which he has composed and he's declining the project. Later, Naushad accepted to compose for the film only on Viswanathan's request. The lyrics were provided by Majrooh Sultanpuri.

Box office 
At the end of its theatrical run, the film had grossed around 1,76,00,000 and netted 88,00,000, thus becoming the eleventh highest grossing film of 1968 with a verdict of average.

Awards 
Won
 Filmfare Award for Best Supporting Actress – Simi Garewal
 Filmfare Award for Best Editing – N. M. Shankar

References

External links 
 

1960s Hindi-language films
1968 films
Hindi remakes of Tamil films
1968 romantic drama films
Films about cancer
Films directed by C. V. Sridhar
Indian romantic drama films